Air Horizont Limited  is a Maltese charter airline headquartered in Msida, Malta based at the Italian Forlì Airport and Zaragoza City. It is a subsidiary of Corporacion Aragonesa Aeronautica S.A..

History
Air Horizont was founded in 2014 by pilots Manuel Sahli and Juan Luis Díez.  Air Horizont has attempted to launch scheduled operations in 2011, it failed because the airline wasn't able to secure adequate funds.

The airline was set to commence operations in May 2015 using a Boeing 737-400 registration 9H-ZAZ, Munich, Seville, Alicante and Rome should be served twice a week. However, the launch was postponed to July 2015, citing delays in receiving its air operating permit. In June 2015 it was announced that Air Horizont will not operate scheduled flights and instead focus on charter flights. The already 4,000 tickets sold have been refunded.

Destinations

Germany
Munich

Hamburg

Berlin

Ireland
Dublin

Italy
Rome

Forlì

Spain
Alicante

Madrid

Seville

Zaragoza

United Kingdom
London

Fleet

As of August 2019, the Air Horizont fleet consists of the following aircraft:

References

External links

 Official website

Airlines of Malta
Airlines established in 2014